Serra do Açor Protected Landscape is a protected landscape in the Centro Region, Portugal. It is one of the 30 areas which are officially under protection in the country.

Protected landscapes of Portugal
Centro Region, Portugal